Sibley House may refer to:

in the United States (by state)
Sibley-Corcoran House, Washington, Massachusetts, listed on the NRHP in Berkshire County, Massachusetts
Sibley House (Detroit), listed on the NRHP in Michigan
Sibley House Historic Site, Mendota, Minnesota, listed on the NRHP in Minnesota
Hiram Sibley Homestead, Sibleyville, New York, listed on the NRHP in Monroe County, New York